The National Security Division Secretary is the Federal Secretary to the National Security Council of Pakistan. The position holder is a BPS-22 grade officer, usually belonging to the Pakistan Administrative Service. The current National Security Secretary is Aamir Hasan.

See also
National Security Advisor
Government of Pakistan
Federal Secretary
Interior Secretary of Pakistan
Cabinet Secretary of Pakistan

References

Federal government ministries of Pakistan